A material is a chemical substance or mixture of substances that constitutes an object.

Material(s) or The Material may also refer to:

Music
 Material (band), an American band led by Bill Laswell 1979–1999
 The Material, an American rock band formed in 2005
 Material (Aco album), 2001
 Material (Blaqk Audio album) or the title song, 2016
 Material (Casiopea album), 1999
 Material (Moebius & Plank album), 1981
 Material, by Yuna, 2015
 Material, an EP by Leæther Strip, 1995

Other uses
 Material (accounting), whether a financial matter is significant
 Material (chess), a player's pieces and pawns on the board
 Material (film), a 2012 South African film
 Materials (journal), a journal of materials science
 Material, a character in the video game series Variable Geo
 Material Design, a design language developed by Google in 2014
 Content (media), sometimes called material

See also

Materiality (disambiguation)
Materiel, commercial or military equipment and supplies